Adithya Jorry Guruh Setiawan (born 18 March 2001) is an Indonesian professional footballer who plays as a forward for Liga 1 club PSIS Semarang.

Club career

PSIS Semarang
He made his professional debut in the Liga 1 on 1 March 2020, against Persipura Jayapura where he played as a substitute. This season was suspended on 27 March 2020 due to the COVID-19 pandemic. The season was abandoned and was declared void on 20 January 2021.

Career statistics

Club

References

External links
 Jorry Guruh at Soccerway

2001 births
Living people
Indonesian footballers
Liga 1 (Indonesia) players
Liga 2 (Indonesia) players
PSIS Semarang players
Persipa Pati players
Association football forwards
People from Rembang Regency
Sportspeople from Central Java